David M. Wehner is the Chief Strategy Officer (CSO) of Meta Platforms (known until 2021 as Facebook, Inc.).

Education
Wehner attended Saint Louis Priory School and graduated in 1986. Wehner graduated from Georgetown University with a BS in Chemistry, where he was an editor for The Hoya. He graduated from Stanford University with an MS in Applied Physics, where he was a National Science Foundation fellow.

Career
Early in his career, Wehner worked at Monitor Group and Hambrecht & Quist. Wehner worked at Allen & Company for nearly a decade until 2010, when he became the CFO of Zynga. At these firms, he held series 7 and series 24 licenses.

Wehner joined Facebook in 2011 as VP of Corporate Finance and Business Planning. Wehner succeeded David Ebersman as CFO of Facebook, Inc. on June 1, 2014.

References

American chief financial officers
Zynga people
Facebook employees
Georgetown College (Georgetown University) alumni
Living people
Stanford University alumni
20th-century American businesspeople
21st-century American businesspeople
Place of birth missing (living people)
Year of birth missing (living people)
American people of German descent